Sarandí del Arapey is a village or populated centre in the eastern part of the Salto Department of northwestern Uruguay.

Geography

Population
In 2011 Sarandí del Arapey had a population of 210.
 
Source: Instituto Nacional de Estadística de Uruguay

References

External links
INE map of Sarandí del Arapey

Populated places in the Salto Department